Bougoula may refer to:

Bougoula, Koulikoro, Mali
Bougoula, Sikasso, Mali